Matty Laidlaw (born 22 January 2004) is an English professional rugby league footballer who plays as a  for Hull F.C. in the Betfred Super League.

In 2022 he made his Hull début in the Super League against Hull Kingston Rovers.

References

External links
Hull FC profile

2004 births
Living people
English rugby league players
Hull F.C. players
Rugby league players from Kingston upon Hull
Rugby league props